Stott Hall Farm is a farm located between the eastbound and westbound carriageways of the M62 motorway in Calderdale, England. It is the only farm in the UK situated in the middle of a motorway and was built in the 18th century on Moss Moor. It lies south of Booth Wood Reservoir where the carriageways are separated between junctions 22 and 23. The road divides for much of its length between the Windy Hill and Deanhead cuttings because of the surrounding geography but a myth persists that it was split because the owners Ken and Beth Wild refused to sell.

Sally Boazman, BBC Radio 2's traffic reporter and CB radio users nicknamed it the Little House on the Prairie. It is separated from the motorway by crash barriers and a fence to keep livestock in and prevent out-of-control vehicles crashing onto the property. It is one of the ten best-known sights on the motorway network. It was the subject of a BBC Radio 4 documentary, a Yorkshire Television documentary and a short film.

References

External links

M62 motorway
Buildings and structures in Calderdale
Farms in Yorkshire